{{Infobox writer 
| name         = Júlio Dantas
| image        = Júlio Dantas - Vitoriano Braga.png
| caption      = 
| birth_date   = 
| birth_place  = Lagos, Portugal
| death_date   = 
| death_place  = Lisbon, Portugal
| occupation   = Doctor, poet, journalist, politician, diplomat and dramatist
| genre        = Poetry
| movement     = Romantism, Academism
| notableworks = A Ceia dos Cardeais''
| influences   = 
| influenced   = 
| footnotes    = 
| signature    = Assinatura Júlio Dantas.svg
}}Júlio Dantas''', GCC (1876  – 1962) was a Portuguese doctor, poet, journalist, politician,  diplomat and  dramatist. He was born in Lagos and was a prolific writer; he cultivated various literary genres, from poetry to novels and journalism, becoming best known as a playwright.  He died in Lisbon.

Portuguese male writers
Education ministers of Portugal
People from Lagos, Portugal
19th-century Portuguese writers
19th-century male writers
1876 births
1962 deaths